Bonnie Doon stop is a tram stop under construction in the Edmonton Light Rail Transit network in Edmonton, Alberta, Canada. It will serve the Valley Line, and is located on the west side of 83 Street, south of 84 Avenue, between Bonnie Doon and Idylwylde. The stop was scheduled to open in 2020; however, as of December 2022 the  Valley Line had not opened and no definite opening date had been announced.

Around the station
Bonnie Doon
Bonnie Doon Shopping Centre
École Maurice-Lavallée
Idylwylde
King Edward Park
University of Alberta Campus Saint-Jean
Vimy Ridge Academy

References

External links
TransEd Valley Line LRT

Edmonton Light Rail Transit stations
Railway stations under construction in Canada
Valley Line (Edmonton)